The Battle of Paso Severino was the first battle of the Revolution of the Lances, an attempt by the Blancos, under Timoteo Aparicio, to overthrow the Colorado-led Government of Uruguay.

1870 in Uruguay
Conflicts in 1870
Battles involving Uruguay
Florida Department